Héctor Tricoche  (July 29, 1955 – July 17, 2022) was a Puerto Rican salsa singer-songwriter. He was a member of Tommy Olivencia's band and was featured as the lead vocals on the hits like "Lobo Domesticado", "Periquito Pin Pin", and "12 Rosas". Tricoche left the band and released his debut solo album Clase Aparte in 1990. He scored his first top-ten hit on the Billboard Tropical Airplay chart with "Mujer Prohibida".

Discography 
 Motorízame (1991)
 A Corazón Abierto (1993)
 In it for Me (1994)
 Oro Salsero 20 Exitos CD1 + CD2 (1994)
 Here I am (1995)
 Hector Tricoche Show (Live 1996)
 New Dawn (1997)
 Rumbero (2005)
 The Greatest Ever Salsa CD1 + CD2 (2008)

References

External Links
 
 

1955 births
2022 deaths
Puerto Rican male singers
People from Juana Díaz, Puerto Rico
Salsa musicians